Wilmer Enrique Cruz Paredes (born 18 December 1965) is a retired Honduran football player. He is currently the manager of Victoria.

Club career
Nicknamed Pájaro (Bird) and Supermán, Cruz played 129 league matches for Real C.D. España and also had spells with 
Platense F.C., F.C. Motagua and Deportes Savio as well as short stints with C.D.S. Vida, Independiente Villela and C.D. Victoria. He played his final league game in January 2001 for Savio against Olimpia.

In September 1999, he was said to be interested to play in Costa Rica but would have to withdraw his candidacy to become mayor of his hometown, Santa Cruz de Yojoa.

International career
Cruz made his debut for Honduras in a May 1991 UNCAF Nations Cup match against Panama and has earned a total of 63 caps, scoring no goals. He has represented his country in 16 FIFA World Cup qualification matches and played at the 1991, 1993, 1995 and 1999 UNCAF Nations Cups as well as at the 1991, 1993, 1996 and 2000 CONCACAF Gold Cups.

His final international was a May 2000 FIFA World Cup qualification match against Panama.

Managerial career
After finishing his playing career with Savio, he became in charge of the team in 2003.
In May 2011, he was manager of hometown club Atlético Municipal. Cruz resigned as coach of second division Parrillas One in February 2012. In February 2013, he was named manager of Honduras Progreso, succeeding Gilberto Machado.

On 19 February 2019, Cruz was once again appointed as manager of Juticalpa.

C.D. Victoria
On 21 May 2019, it was announced that Cruz was named manager of Victoria in the Honduran second division.

Honours and awards

Club
C.D. Real Espana
Liga Profesional de Honduras (2):   1988–89, 1993–94
Honduran Cup: (1): 1992

Country
Honduras
Copa Centroamericana (2): 1993, 1995

References

External links

Wilmer Cruz at Footballdatabase

1965 births
Living people
People from Cortés Department
Association football goalkeepers
Honduran footballers
Honduras international footballers
1991 CONCACAF Gold Cup players
1993 CONCACAF Gold Cup players
1996 CONCACAF Gold Cup players
2000 CONCACAF Gold Cup players
Independiente Villela players
Real C.D. España players
Platense F.C. players
F.C. Motagua players
C.D.S. Vida players
Deportes Savio players
C.D. Victoria players
Liga Nacional de Fútbol Profesional de Honduras players
Honduran football managers
Juticalpa F.C. managers
Copa Centroamericana-winning players